Max Gandrup (born 23 August 1967) is a former Danish badminton player from Herning BK Club. Gandrup, is a three-time medalist at the European junior championships, two-time medalist at the European championships and once a Nordic champion in 1990. His main successes along with a Gold at European championship came in European Grand Prix, where he won international competitions in Bulgaria, Sweden, Scotland, Norway, Finland & Poland besides some second-best performances in Germany, Switzerland and Taiwan.

Achievements

European Championships 
Men's doubles

European  Junior Championships 
Boys' doubles

Mixed doubles

IBF World Grand Prix 
The World Badminton Grand Prix sanctioned by International Badminton Federation (IBF) from 1983 to 2006.

Men's doubles

Mixed doubles

IBF International 
Men's doubles

Mixed doubles

References 

1967 births
Living people
Danish male badminton players